The Nivison is a City Tattersalls Club Group 3 Thoroughbred horse race at set weights with penalties, for mares, four-year-olds and upwards, over a distance of 1200 metres at Randwick Racecourse, Sydney, Australia in October. Total prizemoney for the race is A$200,000.

History
The original name of the race Tarien Quality Handicap was named after the champion mare Tarien, who was a dual Warwick Stakes winner in 1953 and 1954 and also won the 1953 George Main Stakes and 1953 Craven Plate. 

Prior to 2011 the race was scheduled in late September but race was moved to the City Tattersalls Club meeting to mid October in 2011.

Name
 1994–1996 - Tarien Quality Handicap
 1997 onwards - The Nivison

Grade
 1997–2012 - Listed Race
 2013 onwards - Group 3

Venue
 1994–2000 - Randwick Racecourse 
 2001 - Warwick Farm Racecourse
 2002–2003 - Randwick Racecourse 
 2004 - Warwick Farm Racecourse
 2005 onwards - Randwick Racecourse

Distance
 1994 onwards - 1200 metres

Winners

 2021 - Minhaaj
 2020 - Positive Peace
 2019 - Madam Rouge
 2018 - Resin
 2017 - White Moss
 2016 - Egyptian Symbol
 2015 - Nayeli
 2014 - Avoid Lightning
 2013 - Diamond Earth
 2012 - Quidnunc
 2011 - Balmont
 2010 - Marquardt
 2009 - Madame Pedrille 
 2008 - Jewelled Gate 
2007 - †race not held
2006 - Whoever 
2005 - Our Sweet Moss  
2004 - Besame Mucho  
2003 - Lucida    
2002 - Gwendolyn      
2001 - Marlina      
2000 - Spinning Hill         
1999 - Daijobo          
1998 - Razor Blade       
1997 - Stoneyfell Road  
1996 - Amber  
1995 - Sweet Consort   
1994 - Aunty Mary   

† Not held because of outbreak of equine influenza

See also
 List of Australian Group races
 Group races

References

Horse races in Australia